Jack Devine is a veteran of the Central Intelligence Agency (CIA) and a founding partner and President of The Arkin Group LLC.

Biography
Devine's career at the CIA spanned from the late 1960s to the early 1990s, including the fall of President Salvador Allende in Chile in 1973, the Iran–Contra affair in the mid-1980s, and the fight to push the Soviets out of Afghanistan in the late 1980s. Devine retired after serving as both the Acting Director and Associate Director of the CIA's operations outside the United States, a capacity in which he had supervisory authority over thousands of CIA employees involved in sensitive missions throughout the world, as well as Acting Deputy Director of Operations from May 3, 1995 to July 18, 1995.

Devine joined the CIA in 1967, after his wife gave him a book about the CIA and its role in U.S. national security. Devine completed his training at "the Farm" and various other espionage and paramilitary courses. In his first Headquarters assignment he spent time as a “documents analyst” where he shared close quarters with Aldrich "Rick" Ames, who later became a spy for the Soviet Union. Ames would later reemerge as an employee and suspect in the hunt for a mole within the Agency.

His first overseas assignment was to Santiago, Chile in August, 1971. Devine learned the ins and outs of recruiting sources and running covert action operations in the time before the 1973 Chilean coup d'état.

His service on the Afghan Task Force was perhaps the pinnacle of his varied career, and put him at the head of the largest covert action campaign of the Cold War. Devine replaced Gust Avrakotos, the chief of the South Asia Operations Group portrayed by actor Philip Seymour Hoffman in the 2007 film, Charlie Wilson's War, and inherited a program funneling hundreds of millions of dollars to the Afghan mujahideen. It was under Devine that the CIA ramped up threefold support to the mujahideen and made the critical decision to provide them with U.S.-made Stinger anti-aircraft missiles, a move that would ultimately shift the course of the war and force a Soviet retreat. By the time Devine left the Task Force for an assignment as Chief of Station in Rome, the war was winding down.

Devine would go on to run the Counter Narcotics Center and Latin America Division at CIA in the 1990s, and helped oversee the operation that captured Pablo Escobar in 1993. He also served as the head of the division during the military intervention in Haiti in the early 1990s, and was later promoted to Associate Director and Acting Director of Operations as well as serving as Acting Deputy Director of Operations from May 3, 1995 to July 18, 1995. Devine retired from CIA in 1999, after 32 years, and joined the private sector where he joined forces with New York litigation attorney Stanley Arkin. Together they have provided high-end consulting services along with sophisticated international intelligence and investigative services for the last 15 years.

Devine is the recipient of the Agency's Distinguished Intelligence Medal and several meritorious awards. He is a recognized expert in intelligence matters and has written op-eds and articles for The Washington Post, The Financial Times, The Miami Herald and The World Policy Journal. He has also made guest appearances on CBS, NBC, MSNBC, Fox News, as well as the History and Discovery channels, PBS and ABC Radio. On June 13, 2014, speaking in McLean, VA to former intelligence officers he predicted the likely partition of Iraq and further troubles in Afghanistan and Ukraine.

Devine resides in New York City and is a member of the Council on Foreign Relations. He speaks Spanish and Italian.
In 2011, Devine, a former ocean lifeguard in North Wildwood, NJ during his high school years, joined the South Jersey Alumni Team to compete in the United States Lifesaving Association National Championships held in Cape May, NJ. Rowing with fellow CIA retiree, Jim Campbell, who was an alternate sculler for the 1962 US Olympic team 8, Devine and Campbell won a bronze medal in the 65–69 surfboat doubles event. Returning to compete in 2012, Devine won gold in the 70–74 division.

References

External links
Jack Devine, “Top U.S. Goal in Afghanistan Ought to be Capturing bin Laden.” The Washington Post. October 10, 2010.
Jack Devine, “A CIA Solution for Afghanistan.” The Wall Street Journal, July 29, 2010.
Jack Devine, “An Intelligence Reform Reality Check.” The Washington Post, February 18, 2008.
Forbes Profile: John J. Devine.
Jack Devine, “Looking Ahead.” The Washington Post, August 1, 2004.
Jack Devine and Whitney Kassel, “Afghanistan: Withdrawal Lessons.” World Policy Journal, Fall 2013.
Jack Devine and Whitney Kassel, “Assessing Oil Opportunities in South Sudan.” Breaking Energy, September 19, 2013.
Jack Devine and Whitney Kassel, “Natural Gas Assets Play Key Role in Middle East Conflict.”  Breaking Energy, January 11, 2012.
“Q & A with Jack Devine,” Karv Communications, July 21, 2013.
C-SPAN Discussion: Privatization of U.S. Intelligence, August 20, 2009.
NY Sun Interview, August 3, 2005.
NPR Interview, September 9, 2003.
NBC New York Appearance on the Bin Laden Raid.

Year of birth missing (living people)
Living people
People of the Central Intelligence Agency
Recipients of the Distinguished Intelligence Medal